Rupert of Hentzau is a 1923 American silent adventure film directed by Victor Heerman and starring Bert Lytell, Elaine Hammerstein, and Lew Cody. It is an adaptation of Anthony Hope's 1898 novel Rupert of Hentzau, the sequel to The Prisoner of Zenda.

Cast

Preservation
With no prints of Rupert of Hentzau located in any film archives, it is a lost film.

References

Bibliography
 Goble, Alan. The Complete Index to Literary Sources in Film. Walter de Gruyter, 1999.

External links

Stills at the Claire Windsor website

1923 films
1923 adventure films
1920s English-language films
American silent feature films
American adventure films
Films directed by Victor Heerman
American black-and-white films
Selznick Pictures films
Films based on British novels
Films set in Europe
1920s American films
Silent adventure films